This is a list of diplomatic missions in the Federated States of Micronesia.  At present, the island of Pohnpei hosts 4 embassies. One of these (that of China) is located in the capital city of Palikir, while the other three are located in nearby Kolonia (which was formerly the capital and is still the island's largest town). Other countries have missions accredited from other capitals, mostly in Manila, Canberra, and Tokyo.

Embassies
Palikir

Kolonia

Non-resident embassies
Resident in Manila, otherwise noted.

 (Canberra)
 (Canberra)
 (Tokyo)
 (Canberra)
 (Jakarta)

 
 (Singapore)
 (Tokyo)
 
 (Washington, D.C.)
 (Tokyo)
 (Beijing)
 (Tokyo)
 (Tokyo)

 (Canberra)
 (Tokyo)
 (Suva)
 (Tokyo)
 (Tokyo)
 (Tokyo)
 (Suva)
 (Tokyo)
 
 
 
 (Honolulu)
 (Canberra)
 (Wellington)
 (Agana)
 (Tokyo)
 (Seoul)

 (Tokyo)
 (Tokyo)
 (Suva)
  (Beijing)
 (Canberra)

See also
List of diplomatic missions of the Federated States of Micronesia

References
Listing of embassies

Lists of diplomatic missions by receiving country
Diplomatic missions
Diplomatic missions